Fas associated factor family member 2 is a protein that in humans is encoded by the FAF2 gene.

Function

The protein encoded by this gene is highly expressed in peripheral blood of patients with atopic dermatitis (AD), compared to normal individuals. It may play a role in regulating the resistance to apoptosis that is observed in T cells and eosinophils of AD patients. [provided by RefSeq, Jul 2008].

References

Further reading